Christopher Reynolds may refer to:

Christopher Reynolds (linguist) (1922–2015), British linguist
Christopher Reynolds (politician) (1611–1654), early American settler and politician
Christopher Augustine Reynolds (1834–1893), bishop
Paul Reynolds (BBC journalist) (Christopher Paul Michel Reynolds, born 1946), BBC foreign correspondent
Christopher S. Reynolds, astronomer

See also
Chris Reynolds (disambiguation)
Christopher Reynalds (born 1952), British child actor and motor racing champion